The Last Frontier, is an American sitcom that aired on Fox in 1996.  It featured a wealthy woman who moved to Anchorage, Alaska, sharing housing with three men who did not possess her social adeptness.

Cast 
 Anthony Starke as Billy McPherson 
 John Terlesky as Reed Garfield
 Patrick Labyorteaux as Andy
 David Kriegel as Matt Garfield
 Leigh-Allyn Baker as Joy Garfield
 Jessica Tuck as Kate

Episodes

External links

1996 American television series debuts
1996 American television series endings
1990s American sitcoms
English-language television shows
Fox Broadcasting Company original programming
Television shows set in Alaska
Television series by HBO Independent Productions
Television series by 20th Century Fox Television